Lilia Dabija (born 17 October 1982) is a Moldovan jurist. She currently serves as the Minister of Infrastructure and Regional Development in the Recean Cabinet.

References 

Living people
1982 births
Moldovan women in politics
21st-century Moldovan politicians
21st-century Moldovan women politicians